Mewla–Maharajpur is a former constituency of the Haryana Legislative Assembly, in Faridabad, Haryana.

Members of the Legislative Assembly
Source:

References

Former assembly constituencies of Haryana